Reykjavík City Center (Icelandic: Miðborg , Miðbær , and sometimes Austurbær ) is a sub-municipal administrational district that covers much of the central part Reykjavík, the capital of Iceland. The district includes six neighbourhoods: Kvos , Grjótaþorp , Skólavörðuholt , Þingholt , Skuggahverfi  and Vatnsmýri .

Overview
It is the administrative center of Iceland, containing Alþingishúsið (the national parliament buildings), Stjórnarráðshúsið (the cabinet house) and the Supreme Court of Iceland. In addition, the area is home to many of the city's landmarks, including the Tjörnin pond, the town hall, and Hallgrímskirkja, the largest church in Iceland; tourist flow is considerable. The city center is also the center of Reykjavík's nightlife; many of the city's bars and nightclubs are located in Austurstræti (East Street) and Bankastræti (Bank Street).

External links

 More information and photos about Reykjavík City Center on Hit Iceland

Districts of Reykjavík